Waltham Cross railway station is on the West Anglia Main Line, serving the suburban town of Waltham Cross in Hertfordshire, and the neighbouring Waltham Abbey in Essex, England. Its three-letter station code is WLC and it is in Travelcard zone 7.

The station and all trains serving it are operated by Greater Anglia. The station has 4 Oyster card readers rather than ticket barriers.

During the 2012 Olympic Games, Waltham Cross and Cheshunt provided the main rail access to the Lee Valley White Water Centre.

History

Early years (1840-1862)
The first station, together with the railway line from Stratford to Broxbourne, was opened by the Northern & Eastern Railway (N&ER) on 15 September 1840. Originally called Waltham and later renamed to Waltham Cross, it was originally on a site to the north of the road between Waltham Cross and Waltham Abbey.

Following on from negotiations in 1843, the Eastern Counties Railway took over operation of the N&ER from 1 January 1844 paying rent and dividing the profits.

By the 1860s the railways in East Anglia were in financial trouble, and most were leased to the ECR; they wished to amalgamate formally, but could not obtain government agreement for this until 1862, when the Great Eastern Railway was formed by amalgamation. Thus Cheshunt became a GER station in 1862.

Great Eastern Railway (1862-1922)
A signal box was provided in 1881 on the up side just north of the road bridge. Many years later when the road was widened the box was actually located under the bridge itself.

In 1885 the station was relocated to the current site south of the road bridge. A subsequent renaming to Waltham Cross and Abbey was later rescinded.

In 1911 the Waltham Abbey and Cheshunt Gas & Coke Co had two sidings on the down side north of the station. A three siding goods yard was located on the up side of the line.

London & North Eastern Railway (1923-1947)
On 1 January 1923 the GER became part of the London & North Eastern Railway. During World War 2 the yards were busy with traffic from the Lea Valley armaments industry.

British Railways (1948-1994)
The nationalisation of Britain's railways saw the operation of Waltham Cross station pass to British Railways Eastern Region.

From 1958 local passenger services between Cheshunt and London via Tottenham Hale were normally operated by Class 125 diesel multiple units.

As late as the early 1960s the goods yards located north of the station were busy in traffic but these were closed in the 1960s in preparation of the electrification of the Lea Valley line.

The mechanical signal box was closed on 13 January 1969 with its duties being taken over by a panel at Brimsdown.
The lines through Waltham Cross were electrified on 5 May 1969.

The Privatisation area (1994-current)

In 2011, a major redevelopment was carried out at the station in preparation for the London 2012 Olympics.

From 2 January 2013, Oyster cards are accepted at the station. The station is in Travelcard zone 7.

Service

The typical off-peak service between Monday-Saturday is two trains per hour to London Liverpool Street via Tottenham Hale, two trains per hour to Hertford East, one train per hour to Stratford, and one train per hour to Bishops Stortford.

On Sunday, the typical off peak service is two trains per hour to Stratford via Tottenham Hale and two trains per hour to Hertford East.

References

External links

Railway stations in Hertfordshire
Former Great Eastern Railway stations
Greater Anglia franchise railway stations
Railway stations in Great Britain opened in 1840
Waltham Cross